Heteroclytomorpha quadrinotata is a species of beetle in the family Cerambycidae. It was described by Blanchard in 1853. It is known from the Solomon Islands.

References

Homonoeini
Beetles described in 1853